The 1957–58 season was the 20th season of competitive association football in the Football League played by Chester, an English club based in Chester, Cheshire.

It was 20th and the last season spent in the Third Division North as at the end of the season Third Division sections were merged into nationwide Third and Fourth divisions. As Chester finished in the bottom half of the table, the club was transferred to the Fourth Division. Alongside competing in the Football League, the club also participated in the FA Cup and the Welsh Cup.

Football League

Results summary

Results by matchday

Matches

FA Cup

Welsh Cup

Season statistics

References

1957-58
English football clubs 1957–58 season